Sahar Fetrat is an Afghan activist, screenwriter and documentary filmmaker. Sahar was born in Afghanistan and lived in Iran and Pakistan as a young refugee during the first Taliban regime.

Biography 
Sahar's family went into exile when she was one year old, and grew up in refugee camps in Iran and Pakistan during the first Taliban regime.

She graduated in 2018 in Business Studies at the American University of Afghanistan and obtained a master's degree in Gender Studies at the Central European University in Budapest in 2020.

Sahar Fetrat worked in Afghanistan for UNESCO Education Services advocating for women's education throughout the country and an Assistant Researcher at the Women's Rights Division of the international human rights organization Human Rights Watch.

Awards 

 BBC 100 Women 2021

References 

Living people
Women's rights activists
Education activists
BBC 100 Women
Year of birth missing (living people)